Burnholme Community College was a high school on the east side of York, North Yorkshire. It served the suburbs of Heworth, Tang Hall and parts of Osbaldwick. Due to declining enrolment, the college closed in 2014. Some pupils also transferred to Huntington School and Joseph Rowntree School with school buses being provided to serve the area of Tang Hall.

Part of the school site is planned to be used for a new care home.

References

Defunct schools in York
Educational institutions disestablished in 2014
2014 disestablishments in England